Headin' North is a 1921 American silent Western film directed by Charles Bartlett and starring Pete Morrison, Gladys Cooper and Dorothy Dickson.

Cast
 Pete Morrison as Bob Ryan
 Jack Walters as Arthur Stowell
 Gladys Cooper as Madge Mullin
 Dorothy Dickson as Frances Wilson
 William Dills as Hank Wilson
 Barney Furey as The Boob
 Will Frank as Madge's Father

References

Bibliography
 Connelly, Robert B. The Silents: Silent Feature Films, 1910-36, Volume 40, Issue 2. December Press, 1998.
 Munden, Kenneth White. The American Film Institute Catalog of Motion Pictures Produced in the United States, Part 1. University of California Press, 1997.

External links
 

1921 films
1921 Western (genre) films
American silent feature films
Silent American Western (genre) films
American black-and-white films
Arrow Film Corporation films
1920s English-language films
Films directed by Charles Bartlett
1920s American films